Upper Cheung Sha Beach is a gazetted beach in Cheung Sha in southern Lantau Island, Hong Kong. The beach has barbecue pits and is managed by the Leisure and Cultural Services Department of the Hong Kong Government. The beach is rated as good to fair by the Environmental Protection Department for its water quality in the past twenty years. It is still the longest beach in Hong Kong.

History
On 5 June 2015, a body of a woman in her 30s was found floating in the water near the beach. When the marine police and fireboat arrived at the scene, she was pronounced dead.

On 21 November 2018, a carcass of a finless porpoise that had its tail trapped in a fishing net was found by police officers at the beach that caused it to be temporarily closed. The Ocean Park Conservation Foundation had transported the finless porpoise back to Ocean Park for autopsy.

Usage
The beach offers views of Cha Kwo Chau and the Soko Islands.

Features
The beach has the following features:
 BBQ pits (7 nos.)
 Changing rooms
 Showers
 Toilets
 Light refreshment kiosk

See also
 Beaches of Hong Kong

References

External links 

 Official website

Lantau Island
Beaches of Hong Kong